Jongkolphan Kititharakul (born 1 March 1993) is a Thai badminton player who specializes in doubles. She was the women's doubles gold medalist at the 2017 Southeast Asian Games, also part of the team that clinched the women's team gold medals in 2015, 2017 and  2019.

Achievements

Southeast Asian Games 
Women's doubles

BWF World Tour (3 titles, 4 runners-up) 
The BWF World Tour, which was announced on 19 March 2017 and implemented in 2018, is a series of elite badminton tournaments sanctioned by the Badminton World Federation (BWF). The BWF World Tour is divided into levels of World Tour Finals, Super 1000, Super 750, Super 500, Super 300, and the BWF Tour Super 100.

Women's doubles

BWF Grand Prix (3 titles, 2 runners-up) 
The BWF Grand Prix had two levels, the Grand Prix and Grand Prix Gold. It was a series of badminton tournaments sanctioned by the Badminton World Federation (BWF) and played between 2007 and 2017.

Women's doubles

  BWF Grand Prix Gold tournament
  BWF Grand Prix tournament

BWF International Challenge/Series (3 titles, 2 runners-up) 
Women's doubles

Mixed doubles

  BWF International Challenge tournament
  BWF International Series tournament

References

External links 
 

1993 births
Living people
Jongkolphan Kititharakul
Jongkolphan Kititharakul
Badminton players at the 2020 Summer Olympics
Jongkolphan Kititharakul
Badminton players at the 2018 Asian Games
Jongkolphan Kititharakul
Asian Games medalists in badminton
Medalists at the 2018 Asian Games
Competitors at the 2015 Southeast Asian Games
Competitors at the 2017 Southeast Asian Games
Competitors at the 2019 Southeast Asian Games
Competitors at the 2021 Southeast Asian Games
Jongkolphan Kititharakul
Southeast Asian Games medalists in badminton
Universiade bronze medalists for Thailand
Universiade medalists in badminton
Medalists at the 2015 Summer Universiade
Jongkolphan Kititharakul
Jongkolphan Kititharakul